Four tennis events were contested at the 1900 Summer Olympics in Paris, France. These were played at the Cercle des Sports de l'Île de Puteaux. All four events were won by Great Britain. 26 tennis players from 4 nations competed, with over half from the host nation of France.

The field was small but of high quality, particularly with the top British players present. The Doherty brothers, Reginald and Laurence, were the premier players; they won the men's doubles together, Laurence won the men's singles (after Reginald withdrew rather than play his brother in the semifinals), and Reginald partnered with Charlotte Cooper to take gold in the mixed doubles.

The tournament organization was uncertain, with no venue guaranteed until 5 days before the events began. The ten-court l'Île de Puteaux club eventually agreed to host the tournaments. Five of the courts were used, with court #5 the primary one.

Medal summary

Events

Medal table

Participating nations
A total of 26 players from 4 nations competed at the Paris Games:

Non-Olympic events

In addition to the four events recognized as Olympic competitions, there were other tennis events conducted at the l'Île de Puteaux club during the week of the Olympic events. These included handicap events and a professional round-robin men's singles tournament.

References

 International Olympic Committee medal winners database
 De Wael, Herman. Herman's Full Olympians: "Tennis 1900". Accessed 10 March 2006.
 
  ITF, 2008 Olympic Tennis Event Media Guide

 
1900 Summer Olympics events
1900
Olympics
1900 Olympics
Tennis in Paris